Are You the One? is an American reality television series featuring a group of men and women are secretly paired into couples via a matchmaking algorithm. While living together, the contestants try to identify all of these "perfect matches." If they succeed, the entire group shares a prize of up to $1 million.

Series overview

Episodes

Season 1 (2014)

Season 2 (2014)

Season 3 (2015)

Season 4 (2016)

Season 5 (2017)

Season 6 (2017)

Season 7 (2018)

Season 8 (2019)

Season 9 (2023)

Are You the One? Second Chances

Specials

References

Are You the One
Episodes